Don Brockett (January 30, 1930 – May 2, 1995) was an American actor, comedian, producer, and director from Pittsburgh, Pennsylvania. He was known for his portrayal of Chef Brockett on Mister Rogers' Neighborhood. He had small parts in many major films including Flashdance, Fletch Lives, The Silence of the Lambs, and Bob Roberts.

Don Brockett played a zombie in the 1985 George A. Romero film Day of the Dead.

Brockett was one-half of the popular Pittsburgh comedy team, "Brockett and Barbara". He was also known for his annual comedic cinematic look at Pittsburgh, Forbidden Pittsburgh.

Brockett also had bit parts in the movies Flashdance and Houseguest, both of which were filmed in Pittsburgh. Barely six months after the release of Houseguest, Brockett died of a heart attack. Prior to his death, Brockett had been heavily involved in local charities, particularly with polio research. His grave is located at Allegheny Cemetery.

Filmography

References

Don Brockett Papers  (Don Brockett Papers, 1930–1995, CTC.2002.01, Curtis Theatre Collection, Special Collections Department, University of Pittsburgh)

External links

Don Brockett Obituary, New York Daily News

1930 births
1995 deaths
20th-century American comedians
20th-century American male actors
American male comedians
American male film actors
American male television actors
Burials at Allegheny Cemetery
Male actors from Pittsburgh